Paulin Hountondji (born 11 April 1942 in Abidjan, Côte d'Ivoire) is a Beninese French philosopher, politician and academic considered one of the most important figures in the history of African philosophy. Since the 1970s he has taught at the Université Nationale du Bénin in Cotonou, where he is Professor of Philosophy. In the early 1990s he briefly served as Minister of Education and Minister for Culture and Communications in the Government of Benin.

Education and career
Paulin J. Hountondji was educated at the École Normale Supérieure, Paris, graduating in 1966, and taking his doctorate in 1970 (his thesis was on Edmund Husserl).  After two years teaching in Besançon (France), in Kinshasa and Lubumbashi (Democratic Republic of the Congo), he accepted a post at the Université Nationale du Bénin in Cotonou, where he still teaches as Professor of Philosophy.

His academic career was interrupted, however, by a period spent in politics.  Having been a prominent critic of the military dictatorship that had ruled his country, Hountondji became involved in Benin's return to democracy (in 1992), and served in the government as Minister of Education and Minister for Culture and Communications until his resignation and return to the University in 1994.

He is currently director of the African Centre for Advanced Studies in Porto-Novo, Benin, and served as the Bingham Professor of Humanities from 1 August 2008 to 31 December 2008 at the University of Louisville in Louisville, Kentucky.

In 1999, Hountondji was honoured with a Prince Claus Award from the Prince Claus Fund, an international culture and development organisation based in Amsterdam.

Philosophical work
Hountondji's philosophical influences include two of his teachers in Paris, Louis Althusser and Jacques Derrida.  His reputation rests primarily on his critical work concerning the nature of African philosophy.  His main target has been the ethnophilosophy of writers such as Placide Tempels and Alexis Kagame.  He argues that such an approach confuses the methods of anthropology with those of philosophy, producing "a hybrid  discipline without a recognizable status in the world of theory" ([1997], p. 52).  Part of the problem stems from the fact that ethnophilosophy is in large part a response to Western views of African thought; this polemical role works against its philosophical validity.

His approach has widened somewhat in later work; he still rejects ethnophilosophy as a genuine philosophical discipline, but he has moved towards more of a synthesis of traditional African thought and rigorous philosophical method.

Bibliography
Sur la "philosophie africaine", Paris: Maspéro, 1976 — featured on the list of Africa's 100 Best Books of the 20th Century.
published in English (transl. H. Evans & J. Rée) as African Philosophy: Myth and Reality, Bloomington, Indiana: Indiana University Press, 1983.
second edition of the English version (with a preface by Hountondji), 1996.
"What can philosophy do?" Quest 1:2, 1987, pp 2–28.
"Tradition, Hindrance, or Inspiration?" Quest XIV, 2000, 1–2.
 (Editor) Les Savoirs endogènes: pistes pour une recherche, Dakar: Editions du Codesria, 1994.
 Combat pour le sens; un itinéraire africain, Cotonou: Editions du Flamboyant, 1997.
 (Editor) Endogenous Knowledge: research trails, Dakar: Editions du Codesria, 1997.
 (Editor) Economie et société au Bénin, Paris: Editions L'Harmattan, 2000.
 The Struggle for Meaning: Reflections on Philosophy, Culture and Democracy in Africa, Athens: Ohio University Press, 2002.
"True and False Pluralism", 1973 essay, in Tejumola Olaniyan and Ato Quayson (eds), African Literature: An Anthology of Criticism and Theory, Oxford: Blackwell, 2007.

Secondary literature
Franziska Dübgen and Stefan Skupien, Paulin Hountondji: African Philosophy as Critical Universalism. Cham: Palgrave Macmillan / Springer. 2019. . .
F. Abiola Irele, "Hountondji", in Robert L. Arrington (ed.), A Companion to the Philosophers, Oxford: Blackwell, 2001. .
Tsenay Serequeberhan, The Hermeneutics of African Philosophy . London: Routledge. 1994. .

References

See also
African philosophy
Jacques Derrida
Louis Althusser
List of African writers
List of Beninese writers

Beninese writers
1942 births
Living people
Beninese philosophers
People from Abidjan
École Normale Supérieure alumni
Government ministers of Benin
Academic staff of the University of Abomey-Calavi
French philosophers